The women's snowboard cross competition of the 2019 Winter Universiade was held at Sopka Cluster, Krasnoyarsk, Russia on 2 and 3 March 2019.

Results

Qualification

Round Robin

Heat 1

Heat 2

Heat 3

Heat 4

Heat 5

Heat 6

Heat 7

Heat 8

Heat 9

Heat 10

Heat 11

Heat 12

Heat 13

Results

Semifinals

Semifinal 1

Semifinal 2

Small Final

Big Final

References

External links
Qualification results
Round-robin results
Finals results

Women's snowboard cross